Carl Sautter (April 29, 1948 - February 23, 1993) was a writer born in the United Kingdom.

Sautter wrote for television series including Trapper John, M.D. on CBS, Moonlighting on ABC and Beverly Hills, 90210 on FOX. He also contributed to Hanna-Barbera's Jetsons: The Movie.

Biography
Sautter started his professional life as an urban planner for local government before pursuing a career as a writer.  It took seven years of failure before his writing career took off.  Cognisant of the difficulties other writers have in breaking into the entertainment industry, Sautter shared his knowledge as an instructor at screenwriting workshops, including Selling to Hollywood, the New Writers Awards (sponsored by NBC), the Hawaii International Film Festival, and more.

Sautter published How to Sell Your Screenplay in 1992.

Sautter's last major project was as writer and story advisor for the 1993 Italian television series Lucky Luke, based on a French comic book character.  The series featured a largely American cast but was never broadcast in the United States.

Sautter died on February 23, 1993, at the age of 44.

In the mid-1990s, the Scriptwriter's Network created the Carl Sautter Memorial Screenwriting Competition as well as the Producer's Outreach Program for Television.

References

External links
 
Scriptwriter's Network

1948 births
1993 deaths
American male television writers
American television writers
American male screenwriters
20th-century male writers
Screenwriting instructors
20th-century American male writers
20th-century American screenwriters